Three Fantasiestücke for piano, Op. 111, were written in 1851 by Robert Schumann.

History

Title 
Three Fantasiestücke for piano, Op. 111, composed in 1851, is one of four works by Schumann entitled . The other three are:

 Fantasiestücke, Op. 12 (1837), eight pieces for solo piano, also based on Hoffmann's Fantasiestücke in Callots Manier
 Fantasiestücke, Op. 73 (1849), three pieces for clarinet and piano (ad.lib violin or cello)
 Phantasiestücke, Op. 88 (1842), for piano, violin and cello in four movements
 
The title was inspired by the collection of letters and writings about music published in 1814–1815, Fantasiestücke in Callots Manier by E. T. A. Hoffmann, one of Schumann's favourite authors. The composer greatly appreciated the 17th-century engraver's sense of fantasy.

Composition 
In September, Clara Schumann wrote in her diary: "Robert has composed three piano pieces of a grave and passionate character which I like very much."

Inspiration 
In these three pieces, Schumann recaptures the "passionate tone that was characteristic of the Fantasiestücke, Op. 12, composed fourteen years earlier in 1837.
 
They reveal "the composer's ardour, impetuosity and inner youth, followed by a contemplative and peaceful atmosphere". He is said to have written them as a tribute to Beethoven's Opus 111, the Piano Sonata No. 32, because of his predilection for this work.

Details

Duration 
Schumann gave precise indications concerning the tempo, but each pianist adapts it according to his temperament. As a result, the total duration of the performance of the three pieces is variable, between 10 and 12 minutes.

Short description 

The two pianists James Friskin and Irwin Freundlich present the  Three Fantasiestücke for piano, Op. 111 as follows: "These short pieces were intended to be played in sequence; but this does not seem absolutely essential."

1.  [Very quickly, with passionate expression] ( Molto vivace et appassionatamente) in C minor
This has a fine passionate sweep and displays much of Schumann's old power and inspiration; it is technically fairly taxing.Duration: 2–3:45 minutes

2.   (Quite slow) (Piuttosto lento), in A-flat major
Lyrically beautiful and technically simple.Duration: 4:45 / 5:35 minutes

3.   [Powerful and very marked] (Con forza, assai marcato), in C minor
An energetic marchlike tune, with contrasting middle section and coda featuring graceful arabesques.Duration: 3:15 / 3:45 minutes

Selected recordings 
 Claudio Arrau, Edition Schumann, compilation (7 CDs), 1991, opus 111 : CD 6-Track 2, Philips Classics Records 432308–2,  Germany ..
 Maria Grinberg, The Art  of Maria Grinbert, recordings from 1946 to 1976 (34 CDs), 2019 (opus 111: CD20), Scribendum SC814.
 Andreas Haefliger, Schumann :Plusieurs pièces pour piano, 1988 (Schumann, several pieces for piano, 1988), Sony Classical  8869774024.
 Vladimir Horowitz, The Unreleased Live Recordings, 1966-1983 , Sony Classical 88843054582.
 Antonín Kubálek, Piano music of Robert Schumann ( several pieces including opus 111), 1988, Dorian DOR-90116.
 Kun-Woo Paik, Schumann, 2020, Deutsche Grammophon UPC 00028948551460.
 Éric Le Sage, Schumann project: The Complete Piano Solo Music (opus 111: CD 6 tracks 10-12), 2012, Alpha,  .

See also 
 List of compositions by Robert Schumann

References

Sources

Further reading

External links 
Some performances of Robert Schumann's Three Fantasiestücke Op.111:

. .
. .
. .
 Abdel Rahman El Bacha, 2019, duration 12:07 minutes, performed at the  Festival de La Roque-d'Anthéron. The Three Fantasiestücke Op. 111 are the 3rd piece of the program). .
 

 

1851 compositions
Piano music by Robert Schumann
Compositions for solo piano
Schumann
Adaptations of works by E. T. A. Hoffmann